Tritomaria exsectiformis is a species of liverwort belonging to the family Lophoziaceae.

It is native to the Northern Hemisphere.

References

Jungermanniales